Stephen "Scott" Moore (born November 10, 1969) is a retired American Paralympic judoka who competed in international level events. He was the first American judoka to win a gold medal in either Olympic or Paralympic judo at the 2000 Summer Paralympics.

He is now a judo coach in Denver who teaches Paralympic judoka at elite level, he was the head coach for the American judo team at the 2012, 2016 Summer Paralympics, and 2020 Summer Paralympics. His wife, Heidi Moore, is also a judoka and was a participant at the Judo World Championships twice and a Pan American bronze medalist.

References

1969 births
Living people
People with albinism
Sportspeople from Denver
Sports coaches from Colorado
Paralympic judoka of the United States
Judoka at the 1996 Summer Paralympics
Judoka at the 2000 Summer Paralympics
Judoka at the 2004 Summer Paralympics
Medalists at the 1996 Summer Paralympics
Medalists at the 2000 Summer Paralympics
Medalists at the 2004 Summer Paralympics
American male judoka